Barulhinho Bom is an album by Brazilian singer Marisa Monte, released in 1996.  It consists of two discs, the first one recorded on live and the second one in studio. It reached number one in Brasil Hot 100 Airplay.

Track listing

Disc 1 (live)

"Panis Et Circenses" (Gilberto Gil/Caetano Veloso)
"De Noite Na Cama" (Caetano Veloso)
"Beija Eu" (Marisa Monte/Arnaldo Antunes/Arto Lindsay)
"Give Me Love (Give Me Peace On Earth)" (George Harrison)
"Ainda Lembro" (Monte/Nando Reis)
"A Menina Dança" (Galvão/Moraes)
"Dança da Solidão" (Paulinho da Viola)
"Ao Meu Redor" (Reis)
"Bem Leve" (Antunes/Monte)
"Segue o Seco" (Carlinhos Brown)
"O Xote das Meninas" (Zé Dantas/Luiz Gonzaga)

Disc 2 (studio)
"Arrepio" (Brown)
"Magamalabares" (Brown)
"Chuva no Brejo" (Morais)
"Cérebro Eletrônico" (Gilberto Gil)
"Tempos Modernos" (Lulu Santos)
"Maraçá" (Brown)
"Blanco" (Haroldo Campos/Octavio Paz)

References

External links

Marisa Monte albums
1996 albums